= Viktorya Aviyente =

Turkish computational chemist

- Education: Boğaziçi University
- Scientific career
- Fields: Computational chemistry

Viktorya Aviyente is a Turkish computational chemist. Aviyente is a professor emeritus at Boğaziçi University. Her research interests include computational chemistry and molecular modelling. Aviyente completed a B.S. (1973), M.S. (1977), and Ph.D. (1983) in chemistry at Boğaziçi University.
